Terrible Mountain is a summit in Gunnison County, Colorado, in the United States.

References

Mountains of Gunnison County, Colorado
Mountains of Colorado